PriceMinister is a French company that operated an e-commerce website, PriceMinister.com, which was the fifth largest e-commerce website in France by number of visitors. In 2010, it was purchased by Rakuten and in 2018, it was rebranded as Rakuten.com.

History
The company was founded in August 2000, originally located in Paris, at 57 Boulevard de la Villette, in a former zeppelin factory dating from the 1880s. In June 2010, the company was bought by Rakuten, the largest Japanese e-commerce site. The company moved in January 2012 to the former department store "Au Reaumur" in central Paris. In May 2014, four years after the acquisition by Rakuten,  and  announced that they were leaving their positions as CEO and COO of Rakuten Europe and general director of PriceMinister. , co-founder and former director of marketing and communications, was promoted to CEO of PriceMinister.

In late 2018, the site was rebranded as Rakuten and then transferred to the Rakuten domain.

See also
 Consumer-to-consumer electronic commerce

References

External links
 

Online marketplaces of France
Rakuten
Retail companies established in 2000
Internet properties established in 2000
2000 establishments in France
Companies based in Paris